John Blackman (17 August 1891 – 19 July 1941) was a cricketer from British Guiana. He played in three first-class matches for British Guiana from 1912 to 1922.

See also
 List of Guyanese representative cricketers

References

External links
 

1891 births
1941 deaths
Cricketers from British Guiana
Sportspeople from Georgetown, Guyana